Diapoma is a genus of characins from tropical South America.

Species
There are currently 13 recognized species in this genus:
 Diapoma alburnus (R. F. Hensel, 1870)
 Diapoma alegretensis (L. R. Malabarba & S. H. Weitzman, 2003)
 Diapoma dicropotamicus (L. R. Malabarba & S. H. Weitzman, 2003)
 Diapoma guarani (Mahnert & Géry, 1987)
 Diapoma itaimbe (L. R. Malabarba & S. H. Weitzman, 2003)
 Diapoma lepiclastus (L. R. Malabarba, S. H. Weitzman & Casciotta, 2003)
 Diapoma obi (Casciotta, Almirón, Piálek & Říčan, 2012)
 Diapoma pyrrhopteryx Menezes & S. H. Weitzman, 2011
 Diapoma speculiferum Cope, 1894
 Diapoma terofali (Géry, 1964)
 Diapoma thauma Menezes & S. H. Weitzman, 2011
 Diapoma tipiaia (L. R. Malabarba & S. H. Weitzman, 2003)
 Diapoma uruguayensis (Messner, 1962)

References

Characidae
Taxa named by Edward Drinker Cope
Fish of South America